Podulce is a settlement northeast of Raka in the Municipality of Krško in eastern Slovenia. The area is part of the traditional region of Lower Carniola. It is now included with the rest of the municipality in the Lower Sava Statistical Region.

The local church is dedicated to Saint Margaret and belongs to the Parish of Raka. It is a medieval building with a belfry that was added in 1839.

References

External links
Podulce on Geopedia

Populated places in the Municipality of Krško